Samuel Obeng Gyabaa (born 15 May 1997) is a Ghanaian footballer who plays as a forward for SD Huesca, on loan from Real Oviedo.

Club career
Born in Nsapor, Brong-Ahafo Region, Obeng moved to Gurb, Barcelona, Catalonia at the age of ten. After finishing his formation with Getafe CF, he made his senior debut with Girona FC B in the regional leagues, in 2016.

In 2017, Obeng was loaned to Tercera División side EC Granollers for one year. On 5 August of the following year, he signed for Segunda División B side CD Calahorra after a trial period.

In March 2019, Obeng agreed a pre-contract with Real Oviedo, effective as of 1 July; he was initially assigned to the reserves in the third division. He made his first-team debut on 18 August: after coming on as a second-half substitute for Edu Cortina, he scored his team's second in a 2–3 away loss against Deportivo de La Coruña in the Segunda División.

On 16 August 2020, Obeng renewed his contract until 2023 and was definitely promoted to the main squad. In January 2023, he moved to fellow second division side SD Huesca on loan until the end of the season.

References

External links
 
 
 

1997 births
Living people
People from Brong-Ahafo Region
Ghanaian footballers
Association football forwards
Segunda División players
Segunda División B players
Tercera División players
Divisiones Regionales de Fútbol players
Girona FC B players
CD Calahorra players
Real Oviedo Vetusta players
Real Oviedo players
SD Huesca footballers